Henrik Benzelius (7 August 1689 in Strängnäs – 20 May 1758) was Bishop of Lund from 1744 to 1747, and Archbishop of Uppsala in the Church of Sweden from 1747 to his death.

Biography
He was predeceased as Archbishop of Uppsala  by his father Erik Benzelius the Elder as well as by his elder brothers Erik Benzelius the younger and
Jacob Benzelius.
Benzelius was one of the people sent by Charles XII of Sweden to the Middle East, travelling to Egypt and Syria. After returning for a time he took up a post in Lund University. He was elected a member of the Royal Swedish Academy of Sciences in 1746.

See also 
 List of Archbishops of Uppsala
 Minuscule 400 – one of his manuscripts

References

Other sources
 Nordisk Familjebok, article Henrik Benzelius In Swedish
 

1689 births
1758 deaths
People from Strängnäs Municipality
Lutheran archbishops of Uppsala
Lutheran bishops of Lund
18th-century Lutheran archbishops
Members of the Royal Swedish Academy of Sciences
Age of Liberty people